The Aeolus AX7, previously the Dongfeng Fengshen AX7 is a compact CUV produced by Dongfeng Motor Corporation under the Aeolus sub-brand since 2014.

Starting from the 2021 model year, the Aeolus AX7 was sold with the Aeolus name badge instead of the Dongfeng logo. The updated model was called the Aeolus AX7 Pro and features restyled front and rear end designs. For the 2022 model year, the model was called the Aeolus AX7 Plus and features a further revised front bumper based on the AX7 Pro design.

First generation (2014)

The first generation Aeolus AX7 CUV debuted during the 2014 Beijing Auto Show with the Fengshen AX7 being available to the market in October 2014 with prices ranging from 115,700 yuan to 149,700 yuan.

The AX7 is available with two inline-four petrol engines, including a 2.0-litre engine producing  and  mated to a 5-speed manual transmission or a CVT, and a 2.3-litre engine producing  and  mated to a 6-speed automatic transmission.

2018 facelift
A facelift was revealed during the 2018 Beijing Auto Show changing the styling on the front and the rear of the Fengshen AX7.

Dongfeng Fengdu MX5

The Dongfeng Fengdu MX5 is a compact CUV which debuted during the 2016 Chengdu Auto Show, with the MX5 being available to the market in late 2016 with prices ranging from 103,500 yuan to 135,500 yuan.

Platform
The Fengdu MX5 shares the same platform with the Fengshen AX7 with only styling changes done to the front and rear DRGs, featuring restyled bumpers, lamps, and tailgate.

Powertrain
The Fengdu MX5 was available with a 2.0-litre engine with 146 hp and a 1.4-litre turbo engine with 140hp, mated to a six-speed manual transmission or a CVT gearbox.

Second generation (2018)

The second generation Aeolus AX7 was revealed in August 2018 and was available to the Chinese market from September 2018 with prices ranging from 89,800 to 131,800 yuan at launch. The second generation AX7 is powered by a 1.6-litre petrol turbo inline-four engine producing   and  mated to a 6-speed automatic gearbox provided by Aisin and powering the front wheels.

Aeolus AX7 Pro (2021 facelift)
A facelift variant called the Aeolus AX7 Pro was launched in September 2020 for the 2021 model year, featuring a redesigned front end while the powertrain remains unchanged. The AX7 Pro interior trim features a two-tone color theme, and the WindLink media center was updated from version 4.0 to version 5.0, with a larger touchscreen size.

Aeolus AX7 Plus/ Mach Edition (2022 facelift)
A facelift variant called the Aeolus AX7 Plus was set to launch in 2021 for the 2022 model year. The final vehicle launched in September 2021 was called the AX7 Mach Edition (马赫版) while the actual product still wears the Plus badging teased before the launch. The updated model features a slightly redesigned front end while the powertrain remains unchanged.

References

External links 

 Fengshen AX7 Official Website
 Fengdu MX5 Official Website

Aeolus AX7
Compact sport utility vehicles
Crossover sport utility vehicles
Cars introduced in 2014
Front-wheel-drive vehicles
Cars of China